Socheongdo or Socheong Island is a small 5 kilometer long and 3 kilometer wide island in Ongjin County, Incheon, South Korea, located in south Daecheong Island, near the Northern Limit Line. It is situated in the Yellow Sea, lying 200 km northwest of Incheon, 40 km southwest of the mainland of South Hwanghae, North Korea, and 200 km northeast of Shandong Peninsula, China. 

As of 2015 it had a population of 266.

Notes

Islands of Incheon
Islands of the Yellow Sea
Ongjin County, Incheon